The rufous-collared thrush (Turdus rufitorques) is a species of bird in the family Turdidae.

It is endemic to highlands of Middle America, south of the Isthmus of Tehuantepec, occurring in El Salvador, Guatemala, Honduras, and Chiapas state in Mexico.  Its closest relative is the American robin, and like that species, it is found in varied habitats, from towns to forest. It is, however, restricted to highland areas with at least some trees. It is also known as the rufous-collared robin.

References

Further reading

Birds described in 1844
Birds of El Salvador
Birds of Guatemala
Birds of Honduras
Turdus
Birds of Mexico